Brooks Mountain is the highest peak in the York Mountains range on the Seward Peninsula in the U.S. state of Alaska. It has tin ore deposits, and high-grade uranium has also been found in the form of zeunerite.

Geography
Brooks Mountain is an extension of the York Mountain Range and is its highest peak. The York Mountains range forms the watershed divide between north flowing rivers which flow into the Arctic Ocean and the streams that flow into the Bering Sea on the south. The principal rivers rising from the Brooks Mountain are the Mint River, York Creek which joins the Pinauk River, Anderson Creek tributary of the Don River and the Crystal River which is a tributary of the Lost River.

An alternate route is from Port Clarence along a road that follows the Don River course. There is a small airstrip near the mountain above the Crystal Creek, and also two more airstrips near the mouth of the Lost River.

Geology
Geology of the mountain has been studied since 1902. The mountain formation has been reported to be an igneous sedimentary rock formation with granite (in a limited area of ), felsic and mafic dykes. Granites in the southwest face of the mountain contain Zeunerite, a form of uranium. Its age is conjectured to be Mesozoic with intrusions of black slate formations which are in turn dated to the formations of the Cambrian and Pre-Cambrian age. The limestone formations of the Fort Clarence Limestone series are dated to a different set of formations of the Ordovician, Silurian and Devonian age.

Geological mapping of the mountain also indicates that exposed bed rock formations are of highly altered limestones rocks and black slates, similar to the formation noted of slates near York Mountains. These are sedimentary formations which are interspersed with many dykes of granite and rhyolite, generally oriented in an east and west strike. Tourmaline and garnet are also recorded.

Uranium
Radiometric survey and mineralogical studies have been carried out since 1950, which has assessed that the mountain formation contains high-grade uranium. Detailed investigations were also carried out during July–August 1951. Uranium was found mainly in the form of zeunerite at three locations though other rock types showed a certain degree of radioactivity.

References
 

Landforms of Nome Census Area, Alaska
Mountains of Alaska
Mountains of Unorganized Borough, Alaska
Landforms of the Seward Peninsula